Prasophyllum giganteum, commonly known as the bronze leek orchid, is a species of orchid endemic to the south-west of Western Australia. It is a tall, fragrant leek orchid with a single smooth, tubular leaf and up to fifty or more green and pinkish-purple flowers with a frilly labellum.

Description
As with others in the genus, the flowers are inverted so that the labellum is above the column rather than below it. The lateral sepals are joined to each other and the petals face forwards. The labellum is white, tinged with pink, turns upwards through about 90° and has a frilly edge. Flowering occurs from September to November but usually only after fire the previous summer.

Taxonomy and naming
The bronze leek orchid was first formally described in 1840 by John Lindley and the description was published in A Sketch of the Vegetation of the Swan River Colony. The specific epithet (giganteum) is a Latin word meaning "large" or "gigantic", referring to the tall flowering stem.

Distribution and habitat
The bronze leek orchid  grows in heath and woodland in coastal areas and occurs between Kalbarri and Israelite Bay in the Esperance Plains, Geraldton Sandplains, Jarrah Forest, Swan Coastal Plain and Warren biogeographic regions.

Conservation
Prasophyllum giganteum is classified as "not threatened" by the Western Australian Government Department of Parks and Wildlife.

References

External links 
 

gibbosum
Endemic flora of Western Australia
Endemic orchids of Australia
Plants described in 1840